Ficus hebetifolia is a species of plant in the family Moraceae. It is found in Brazil, Colombia, and Guyana.

References

hebetifolia
Least concern plants
Taxonomy articles created by Polbot